Park Jun-won (born July 23, 1989), better known by his stage name pH-1, is a Korean-American rapper based in South Korea. In 2017, he signed to H1ghr Music. In 2018, he appeared on Show Me the Money 777 and gained popularity.

Early life and education
Park was born in South Korea and moved with his family to Long Island, New York, when he was about 12 years old. He studied biology at Boston College and worked as a dental assistant post-graduation. Park was later employed at a web development company. 

The stage name pH-1 is a combination of his name, "p" from his surname Park, "H" from the English name Harry, and "Won" from the Korean name Park Jun-won.

Career
In 2016, pH-1 released his debut single "Wavy". In May 2017, he signed to H1ghr Music. In October, he released his debut extended play The Island Kid. In 2018, he appeared on Show Me the Money 777 and gained popularity. In 2019, he released his debut studio album HALO. In May 2020, he released his debut mixtape X. In September, he participated in H1ghr Music's compilation albums H1ghr: Red Tape and H1ghr: Blue Tape. In 2022, he released his second studio album But for Now Leave Me Alone.

Artistry 
pH-1 is known for his melodic "singing-raps". He gets inspiration from a wide range of musical genres: jazz, pop, R&B, and gospel music.

As the three keywords he pursues in his music are truth, positivity, and experience, his work contains positive or honest messages, generally excluding references to drugs, money bragging and excessive "flexing", and explicit sexual content.

Personal life 
pH-1 has a dog named Holly.

Discography

Studio albums

Mixtape

Extended plays

Singles

Tours 

 About Damn Time Tour (2023)

Filmography

Television show

Awards and nominations

Notes

References

External links

 

1989 births
Morrissey College of Arts & Sciences alumni
Living people
South Korean male rappers